Encephalartos laurentianus, commonly called the malele or Kwango giant cycad, is a species of cycad that is native to northern Angola and southern Congo (Zaire), mostly along the Kwango River. This is also said to be the fastest growing cycad, producing up to five "flushes" (rosettes, or clusters) of leaves each year. The species was discovered in 1902 by Louis Gentil.

References

External links
 
 

laurentianus
Taxa named by Émile Auguste Joseph De Wildeman